In molecular biology, U83B belongs to the C/D family of snoRNAs. U83B like U83A has no documented RNA target and they share the same host gene with the C/D box snoRNA U43 (RPL3).
N.B. U83A/B/C have no sequence similarity with the U83 snoRNA that was cloned by Jady and Kiss (2000).

References

External links 
 

Small nuclear RNA